"BLIT" (acronym of Berryman Logical Image Technique) is a 1988 science fiction short story by the British writer David Langford. 

It has a setting where highly dangerous types of images called "basilisks" have been discovered; these images contain patterns within them that exploit flaws in the structure of the human mind to produce a lethal reaction, effectively "crashing" the mind the way a computer program crashes when given data that it fails to process.

Summary 
The story is broken up into sections of narrative and expository sections on the nature of the "basilisks" or "BLITs" written in a pseudo-scientific style. The expository sections detail the accidental discovery of the "basilisks" at the "Cambridge IV" supercomputer facility, and attempts to give explanations for why the basilisks are so harmful to humans, including that they are "Gödelian 'spoilers', implicit programs which the human equipment cannot safely run", or that they produce neurochemical "memotoxins" in the human brain that cause it to die.

The narrative sections detail a young man named Robbo, a member of a racist, far-right terrorist organisation known as the "Albion Action Group", who enters a majority-Asian area with a stencil and spraypaint in order to spray a basilisk known as the "Parrot" on walls. He wears "shatter-goggles", which blur and distort his vision like a kaleidoscope, to avoid looking at the "Parrot". As he is approaching a gay pub to spray the "Parrot" onto a wall where those exiting will see it, he is caught by the police - and in the process accidentally kills four of them with the stencil. 

Robbo is subsequently arrested and taken to the police station, where the police lament that they are unable to put him in prison because there are not yet any laws against spraying "basilisks" on walls; the officers compare it to the early days of computer hacking, when even disruption of international communications was only definable as "Illegal Use Of Electricity" - a fine of "sixty pee (pence)". They are unable to even arrest him for the deaths of the arresting officers; the only evidence of murder is the stencil, which obviously cannot be confirmed as a "basilisk" without killing anyone who looks at it. All they can do is fine him for spraying graffiti, so after beating the locations of all the "parrots" he painted out of him (disguised as a "fall down the stairs") he is locked in a holding cell to be released the next morning.

As Robbo sits alone in his cell, he thinks about the fact he cannot possibly be put away for his crimes and comes to the conclusion that, in the long run, he will be okay. He idly finds himself imagining the distorted image of the "Parrot" he has seen through his "shatter-goggles" - and realises that he has looked at the image through the goggles so many times that his brain is now able to "decode" it from the distorted fragments in his memory. The story ends with Robbo begging the police for alcohol and trying desperately not to imagine the "Parrot", but to no avail; just as the stencil cannot be confirmed as a murder weapon, the police cannot be accused of negligent homicide for failing to provide him with a means to erase his short-term memory. He is killed by its effects.

Release 
"BLIT" was first published in the September-October 1988 issue of Interzone. It has been followed by three sequel pieces, the first of which was released in 1990 as  "What Happened at Cambridge IV". "BLIT" was republished in Interzone: The 4th Anthology (1989) and in a 2004 collection of Langford's works, Different Kinds of Darkness.

Themes 
The story marked a departure for Langford from his typically humorous storytelling style. It also introduced the concept of the "basilisk" to science fiction literature. This term was used within the story to identify highly dangerous types of images that contain patterns within them that exploit flaws in the structure of the human mind to produce a lethal reaction, effectively "crashing" the mind the way a computer program crashes when given data that it fails to process.

Basilisk 
Basilisks are images that are capable of crashing the human mind by triggering thoughts that the mind is physically or logically incapable of thinking. The image's name comes from the basilisk, a legendary reptile said to have the power to cause death with a single glance.

The idea has appeared elsewhere; in one of his novels, Ken MacLeod has characters explicitly mention (and worry about encountering) the "Langford Visual Hack". Similar references, also mentioning Langford by name, feature in works by Greg Egan and Charles Stross.

Sequels 
The story has three sequels: "What Happened at Cambridge IV", "comp.basilisk FAQ", and "Different Kinds of Darkness". The last story imagines a post-apocalyptic world where BLIT images are everywhere, and millions have already been murdered by terrorist attacks utilizing them. Television and the internet have been outlawed due to the proliferation of BLIT images.  In order to protect children, special chips have been planted in their brains that creates a subjective and artificial darkness (which the children call "type-two darkness") to obscure any possible BLIT image they may inadvertently look at. The main characters, all school children, form the "Shudder Club", where they take turns looking at an illicitly obtained non-lethal BLIT image to see how long they last, inadvertently vaccinating themselves against it.

"COMP.BASILISK FAQ", first published in Nature in December 1999, mentions William Gibson's Neuromancer (1984), Fred Hoyle's The Black Cloud (1957), J. B. Priestley's The Shapes of Sleep (1962), and Piers Anthony's Macroscope (1969) as containing a similar idea.

Reception 
Reception for the story has been positive and Susie Vrobel has written that "BLIT" has become well known for its use of fractal patterns. Matthew Sanborn Smith reviewed "BLIT" for StarShipSofa in 2008. John Clute noted that "Like the fractal caltrap it describes, David Langford's stunning "Blit" gives off a steely medusoid glare; and one is very glad the tale is so short".

Cultural influence 
Authors Ken MacLeod and Greg Egan both acknowledge the idea with a specific reference to Langford"the Langford visual hack" in The Cassini Division (1998) and "the Langford Mind-Erasing Fractal Basilisk" in Permutation City (1994). Charles Stross also refers to a type of magical ward known as the "Langford Death Parrot" in The Fuller Memorandum (2010) and "Basilisk attacks" with "Langford fractals" in Accelerando (2005). Acknowledging these inspirations, SF Encyclopedia noted that this story has "proved mildly influential in sf circles". "Basilisk hacks" that affect the mind of any transhuman who perceives them are a primary method of operation of the Exsurgent Virus in the science-fiction/horror role-playing game Eclipse Phase. 

The concept of "basilisk hack" has also been mentioned in scholarly literature, with Langford's BLIT story attributed as its origins.

See also
 Roko's basilisk
 McCollough effect, a real-world optical illusion that, after viewing, can cause long-term changes in visual perception.
 In Neal Stephenson's 1992 book Snow Crash, the title refers to a black-and-white image that when viewed, causes a stroke in the viewer.

References

Sources
BLIT, David Langford, Interzone, 1988.
What if... the human brain could be hacked into?, Dave Langford, T3, August 1999.

1988 short stories
Science fiction short stories
Works originally published in Interzone (magazine)
British short stories
Terrorism in fiction